Woh Chai Shan, a.k.a. Shek Kip Mei Hill, Mission Hill or Bishop Hill, is a hill in Shek Kip Mei, New Kowloon, Hong Kong. It is approximately 86 metres (282 feet) tall.

The hill is zoned as open space under Hong Kong's town planning system. It is mostly undeveloped and is used by some local residents for recreation and leisure. The Kwun Tong line of the Mass Transit Railway (MTR) runs beneath the hill.

Service reservoir

The top of the hill is the site of a former service reservoir of the Water Supplies Department, officially known as Ex-Sham Shui Po Service Reservoir, previously known as the Sham Shui Po Fresh Water Break Pressure Tank, that was disused due to structural issues. Demolition of the covered (underground) reservoir began in December 2020, but was halted after the works revealed well-preserved Roman-style arches dating to 1904. The Antiquities and Monuments Office was summoned to assess the site. Heritage groups, lawmakers, district councillors, and members of the public have called for the structure's preservation. Comparisons have been made to Paddington Reservoir Gardens, in Sydney, a successful conversion of a similar historic reservoir to a public garden.

On 29 December 2020, the government announced that the reservoir would be preserved. Heritage commissioner Ivanhoe Chang apologised for the incident and pledged to "make sure that this will not happen again". Sham Shui Po district councillor Kalvin Ho blamed the Water Supplies Department for furnishing misleading and "very dark" photos to the council prior to the commencement of demolition.

On 5 January 2021, the Water Supplies Department began tidying the site and temporarily strengthening the structure in preparation for "future rehabilitation and conservation". On 10 June 2021, the Ex-Sham Shui Po Service Reservoir was listed as a Grade I historic building.

See also
 Garden Hill, a nearby hill in Sham Shui Po District sometimes also called "Shek Kip Mei Hill"

References

External links

 
 Pictures of birds at Woh Chai Shan
 Antiquities Advisory Board Pictures of Ex-Sham Shui Po Service Reservoir
 Virtual tour of Ex-Sham Shui Po Service Reservoir on Water Supplies Department website

Mountains, peaks and hills of Hong Kong
Shek Kip Mei